Hugo or HUGO may refer to:

Arts and entertainment
 Hugo (film), a 2011 film directed by Martin Scorsese
 Hugo Award, a science fiction and fantasy award named after Hugo Gernsback
 Hugo (franchise), a children's media franchise based on a troll
 Hugo (game show), a television show that first ran from 1990 to 1995
 Hugo (video game), several video games released between 1991 and 2000
 Hugo (album), a 2022 album by Loyle Carner

People and fictional characters
 Victor Hugo, a French poet, novelist, and dramatist of the Romantic movement.
 Hugo (name), including lists of people with Hugo as a given name or surname, as well as fictional characters
 Hugo (musician), Thai-American actor and singer-songwriter Chulachak Chakrabongse (born 1981)
 Hugo (footballer, born 1974), Brazilian footballer
 Hugo (footballer, born 1976), Portuguese footballer
 Hugo (footballer, born 1980), Brazilian footballer
 Hugo (footballer, born 1983), Brazilian footballer
 Hugo Cabral (born 1988), Brazilian footballer
 Hugo (footballer, born 1997), Brazilian footballer
 Hugo (footballer, born 2001), Brazilian footballer

Places in the United States
 Hugo, Alabama, an unincorporated community
 Hugo, Colorado, a Statutory Town
 Hugo, Minnesota, a town
 Hugo, Missouri, an unincorporated community
 Hugo, Oklahoma, a city
 Hugo, Oregon, an unincorporated area
 Hugo, West Virginia, an unincorporated community

HUGO
 HUGO (cable system), a submarine telecommunications cable
 Human Genome Organisation
 HUGO Gene Nomenclature Committee (HGNC), often (incorrectly) referred to as "HUGO"
 Hawaiian Underwater Geological Observatory - see Kamaʻehuakanaloa Seamount

Other uses
 Hugo (mascot), the mascot of the Charlotte Hornets team
 Hugo (software), a static site generator
 2106 Hugo, an asteroid named after French writer Victor Hugo
 Hugo (crater), a crater on the planet Mercury
 Hugo's, a grocery chain in the United States
 Hurricane Hugo, a hurricane in September 1989
 HU-GO, an electric vehicle manufactured in Hacettepe University, Turkey
 Hugo (cocktail), aperitif based on prosecco and elderflower syrup

See also 
 Hugh (disambiguation)
 Hughes (disambiguation)
 Hugues (disambiguation)
 Huw, a given name
 Ugo (disambiguation)